Stealing Beauty is a 1996 drama film directed by Bernardo Bertolucci and starring Liv Tyler, Joseph Fiennes, Jeremy Irons, Sinéad Cusack, and Rachel Weisz. Written by Bertolucci and Susan Minot, the film is about a nineteen-year-old American woman who travels to a lush Tuscan villa near Siena to stay with family friends of her poet mother, who recently died. The film was an international co-production between France, Italy, and the United Kingdom, and was Tyler's first leading film role.

Stealing Beauty premiered in Italy in March 1996, and was officially selected for the 1996 Cannes Film Festival in France in May. It was released in the United States on June 14, 1996.

The film was made entirely in the Tuscany region of Italy during the summer of 1995. The main location for filming was the estate of Castello di Brolio, and a small villa on the property.

Plot

American Lucy (Liv Tyler), 19, daughter of the (now deceased) poet and model, Sara Harmon, arrives at the Tuscan villa of her mom's friends Ian and Diana Grayson (Donal McCann and Sinéad Cusack). Other guests are: a NYC art gallery owner, an Italian advice columnist and dying English writer, Alex Parrish (Jeremy Irons).

Going for a swim, Lucy finds Diana's daughter Miranda Fox (Rachel Weisz) with her boyfriend, entertainment lawyer Richard Reed (D. W. Moffett). Her brother, Christopher (Joseph Fiennes), has yet to arrive, on a road trip with Niccolò Donati (Roberto Zibetti) from a nearby villa. Lucy hoped to see Niccolò, as she had met him four years ago and was her first kiss. They had briefly written; one letter in particular she had memorized.

Lucy's father sent her, so Ian could sculpt her, but it's an excuse for him to send her to Italy. Smoking marijuana with Parrish, Lucy reveals she is a virgin, which he shares with the rest of the villa the next day. Furious, she decides to end her visit. However, before she can book the flight, Christopher and Niccolò appear, and Lucy is happy, but disappointed Niccolò did not recognise her.

That evening, Niccolò and his brother, Osvaldo (Ignazio Oliva) come to the Graysons'. After dinner, the youth separate from the adults to smoke. Lucy is now over Parrish's betrayal, and they take turns recounting how they each lost their virginity. When it's Osvaldo's turn, he demurs, saying, "I don't know which is more ridiculous, this conversation or the silly political one going on over there [at the adults' table]." Lucy fawns over Niccolò, but then vomits in his lap.

The next day, Lucy cycles to the Donati's, seeking Niccolò. She's told he's in the garden, where Lucy finds him with another. Upset, she hastily cycles away from the compound. When she passes Osvaldo, he cries out, "Ciao, Lucy!", she doesn't hear, then crashes. Ignoring his offer to help, she rides on.

Lucy, posing outdoors for Ian's sketch, exposes one of her breasts. When Niccolò and Osvaldo arrive by car, Niccolò ogles Lucy, but Osvaldo looks away. Lucy wanders off into an adjacent olive grove, followed by Niccolò. They begin to kiss, but Lucy soon pushes him away.

Retreating to the guest house, Lucy shares her notebook with Parrish. It is one of her mother's last notebooks, containing a poem Lucy thinks holds clues to the identity of her real father. Throughout the film, she has been asking probing questions about her mother. Did Parrish ever know Sara to wear green sandals? Had Ian ever eaten olive leaves? Had Carlo Lisca (Carlo Cecchi), a war correspondent friend of the Graysons whom Sara had known, ever killed a viper? These images are all found in the poem, which Lucy now reads to Parrish. He agrees it must refer to her dad.

That evening, Lucy wears her mother's dress to the Donati's annual party. Soon after arriving, she sees Niccolò with another girl, and they do not speak. Then she sees Osvaldo playing clarinet in the band. Later, seeing him dancing with a girl, they exchange earnest glances. Lucy picks up a young Englishman to take back to the Grayson's villa. On the way out, Osvaldo chases Lucy down, saying he's interested in visiting America. They agree to meet the next day. The Englishman spends the night with her at the villa, but without sex.

The next day, Parrish is hospitalized. Lucy skulks around his quarters in the guest house afterward. Looking out a window, seeing Ian's sculpture of a mother and child, she has an epiphany. Lucy asks Ian where he was in August 1975, when she was conceived. He says he was here, fixing up the villa, possibly when he was doing Lucy's mother's portrait. He says they could ask Diana, but then remembers she was in London, finalizing her divorce. They realize Ian is Lucy's biological father, and she promises to keep the secret.

Meanwhile, Osvaldo arrives. Lucy gets stung by bees as she exits Ian's studio, so he helps, putting clay on the welts. Walking through the countryside, Osvaldo confesses he wrote to her once. This was the letter Lucy loved above all, the one she knew by heart. Osvaldo then takes her to the tree from the letter.

Lucy and Osvaldo spend the night under the tree. As they part the next morning, Osvaldo reveals that it was his first time, too.

Cast

 Liv Tyler as Lucy Harmon
 Joseph Fiennes as Christopher Fox
 Jeremy Irons as Alex Parrish
 Sinéad Cusack as Diana Grayson
 Donal McCann as Ian Grayson
 Rebecca Valpy as Daisy Grayson
 Jean Marais (in his last film role) as M. Guillaume
 Rachel Weisz as Miranda Fox
 D. W. Moffett as Richard Reed
 Carlo Cecchi as Carlo Lisca
 Jason Flemyng as Gregory
 Anna Maria Gherardi as Chiarella Donati
 Ignazio Oliva as Osvaldo Donati
 Stefania Sandrelli as Noemi
 Francesco Siciliano as Michele Lisca
 Mary Jo Sorgani as Maria
 Leonardo Treviglio as Lieutenant
 Alessandra Vanzi as Marta
 Roberto Zibetti as Niccolò Donati

Production
Liv Tyler admitted she bitterly fought against appearing topless in this movie. "Of course the thought of showing your body parts is a terrifying thought - I find it terrifying. Let alone the whole world. And I fought it until the very end."

Soundtrack
 "2 Wicky" (Burt Bacharach) by Hooverphonic
 "Glory Box" by Portishead
 "If 6 Was 9" (Jimi Hendrix) by Axiom Funk 
 "Annie Mae" by John Lee Hooker 
 "Rocket Boy" by Liz Phair
 "Superstition" by Stevie Wonder
 "My Baby Just Cares For Me" (Walter Donaldson) by Nina Simone 
 "I'll Be Seeing You" (Sammy Fain) by Billie Holiday
 "Rhymes Of An Hour" (Hope Sandoval) by Mazzy Star
 "Alice" by Cocteau Twins
 "You Won't Fall" by Lori Carson
 "I Need Love" by Sam Phillips
 "Say It Ain't So" by Roland Gift
 "Horn concerto in D K412, 2nd movement" by Wolfgang Amadeus Mozart
 "Clarinet concerto in A K622, 2nd movement" by Wolfgang Amadeus Mozart

Additional songs
 "Rock Star" by Hole was also used in the film. Tyler is shown dancing and singing wildly along to the track, listening with her headphones and walkman.
 Björk's song "Bachelorette" of her 1997 album Homogenic was originally written to be part of the soundtrack and its first working title was "Bertolucci". Björk later faxed Bertolucci to inform him the song would be used on her upcoming album instead.

Reception
Roger Ebert of the Chicago Sun-Times, gave it 2 out of 4, and wrote: "The movie plays like the kind of line a rich older guy would lay on a teenage model, suppressing his own intelligence and irony in order to spread out before her the wonderful world he would like to give her as a gift....The problem here is that many 19-year-old women, especially the beautiful international model types, would rather stain their teeth with cigarettes and go to discos with cretins on motorcycles than have all Tuscany as their sandbox."

Critics such as Desson Thomson of The Washington Post, Mick LaSalle of the San Francisco Chronicle, and James Berardinelli of ReelViews gave negative reviews, with Berardinelli in particular, calling the movie 'an atmosphere study, lacking characters', and Thompson calling it 'inscrutable'.

Others, such as Jonathan Rosenbaum of Chicago Reader, Peter Travers of Rolling Stone, Janet Maslin of The New York Times, and Jack Mathews of the Los Angeles Times were more positive, with Rosenbaum in particular praising the movie's 'mellowness' and 'charm'.

On Rotten Tomatoes the film has an approval rating of 50% based on 52 reviews, with an average rating of 6/10. On Metacritic the film has a score of 60% based on reviews from 20 critics, indicating "mixed or average reviews". Audiences surveyed by CinemaScore gave the film a grade "B−" on scale of A to F.

Box office
The film had admissions in France of 184,721.

References

External links
 
 
 

1990s coming-of-age drama films
1996 romantic drama films
1990s teen drama films
1990s teen romance films
1996 films
British coming-of-age drama films
British romantic drama films
British teen drama films
British teen romance films
Coming-of-age romance films
1990s English-language films
English-language French films
English-language Italian films
Films about virginity
Films directed by Bernardo Bertolucci
Films produced by Jeremy Thomas
Films set in Tuscany
Films shot in Tuscany
Fox Searchlight Pictures films
French coming-of-age drama films
French romantic drama films
French teen films
1990s French-language films
1990s German-language films
Italian coming-of-age drama films
Italian romantic drama films
1990s Italian-language films
1990s Spanish-language films
1996 multilingual films
British multilingual films
French multilingual films
Italian multilingual films
1990s British films
1990s French films